Burnaugh, Kentucky is an unincorporated community located in Boyd County, Kentucky along U.S. Route 23.  Being located between the Burgess Station, a former C&O Freight and passenger terminal and Kavanaugh, it takes its name from the combination of the two communities. It is located on both the former Mayo Trail (Ky. Rt. 3 prior to 1964) and present-day U.S. Route 23. Burnaugh is located within the ZIP Code Tabulation Area for zip code 41129, which includes the nearby city of Catlettsburg.

Special Metals Corporation has operated a facility at Burnaugh since 1967.

References

Unincorporated communities in Boyd County, Kentucky
Unincorporated communities in Kentucky